Dea Chiefdom is a chiefdom in Kailahun District of Sierra Leone with a population of 9,876. Its capital is Baiwala.

References 

Chiefdoms of Sierra Leone
Eastern Province, Sierra Leone